Marandiz (also Romanized as Mārāndīz; also known as Marandez and Mīrāndīz) is a village in Yunesi Rural District, Yunesi District, Bajestan County, Razavi Khorasan Province, Iran. At the 2006 census, its population was 2,668, in 678 families.

References 

Populated places in Bajestan County